Roelof Hordijk (2 May 1917 – 4 July 1979) was a Dutch fencer. He competed in the individual épée event at the 1948 Summer Olympics.

References

External links
 

1917 births
1979 deaths
Dutch male épée fencers
Olympic fencers of the Netherlands
Fencers at the 1948 Summer Olympics
People from Central Java
Dutch people of the Dutch East Indies